Christos Hadjipaschalis (Greek: Χρίστος Χατζηπασχάλης; born 1 August 1999) is a Cypriot footballer who plays as a midfielder.

Career
On 15 May 2016, Hadjipaschalis made his league debut for Anorthosis, playing the last 12 minutes in a 2-2 draw with APOEL.

References

External links
 http://www.cfa.com.cy/Gr/playerclubs/1789182/41124

1999 births
Living people
Cypriot footballers
Anorthosis Famagusta F.C. players
Cypriot First Division players
Association football midfielders
Cyprus youth international footballers